Overseas Chinese Town Enterprises Co. is a Chinese state-owned enterprise. It was supervised by the State-owned Assets Supervision and Administration Commission of the State Council. Overseas Chinese Town Enterprises is the parent company of publicly traded companies Overseas Chinese Town Limited, Overseas Chinese Town (Asia) (a subsidiary of Overseas Chinese Town Company) and Konka Group. It is engaged in cross-sector and cross-industry operation.

The company was founded on 1985 and is headquartered in Shenzhen, China. Since 1985, the company has fostered three leading major businesses in China, which are tourism and related cultural industry, real estate, hotel development, and manufacture of electronic products.  As the listed subsidiary, OCT A provides a platform for capital operation of OCT group. 

The company is well known for its nationally famous brands, including six Happy Valley amusement parks, Konka Group, Splendid China Folk Village, Window of the World, OCT East, OCT Grand Hotel, Venice Hotel, OCT Harbour and so on.

History

In 1985, OCT starting from a stretch of mud flat beside Shenzhen Bay. 
In  1994, the former CEO Ren Kelei started reconstructing OCT group's business structure by cutting from more than 30 industries to only 3 main focusing areas. 
In November 1997, OCT Group incorporated a subsidiary OCT Holding and listed on Shenzhen Stock Exchange.
In 2000, OCT Group has invested to construct multiple large-scale comprehensive projects, such as Beijing OCT, Shenzhen OCT East, Shanghai OCT, Shanghai Pujiang OCT, Chengdu OCT, Jiangsu Taizhou OCT, Shenzhen Happy Harbor, Yunnan OCT, Tianjin OCT, Wuhan OCT, Xi’an OCT, Qingdao OCT, and so on. 
In 2004, OCT had been granted a title of the first batch of “National Culture Industry Demonstration Base” by the State Ministry of Culture and had been granted the title of one of the first two “National Culture Industry Demonstration Park Area” by the State Ministry of Culture in August 2007. 
In 2010, OCT Group has been granted the title of “Top 30 Culture Enterprise” by the Publicity Department of the Communist Party of China. 
In 2015, consulting and design firm AECOM ranked OCT parks China as #4 of Top 10  Worldwide Theme Park Groups with 30 million visitors in the year.

List of amusement parks

References

Companies based in Shenzhen
Amusement park companies
Government-owned companies of China
Chinese companies established in 1985
Real estate companies of China